The Lights of New York is a 1922 American silent drama film directed by Charles Brabin and starring Clarence Nordstrom, Margaret Seddon and Frank Currier.

Cast
 Clarence Nordstrom as Robert Reid 
 Margaret Seddon as Mrs. Reid 
 Frank Currier as Daniel Reid 
 Florence Short as Mary Miggs 
 Charles K. Gerrard as Jim Slade 
 Marc McDermott as Charles Redding 
 Estelle Taylor as Mrs. George Burton

References

Bibliography
 Solomon, Aubrey. The Fox Film Corporation, 1915-1935: A History and Filmography. McFarland, 2011.

External links

1922 films
1922 drama films
Silent American drama films
Films directed by Charles Brabin
American silent feature films
1920s English-language films
American black-and-white films
Fox Film films
1920s American films